Lori McNeil and Rennae Stubbs were the defending champions but only McNeil competed that year. She competed with Martina Navratilova and won in the final against Pam Shriver and Elizabeth Smylie, 6–3, 6–4.

Seeds
Champion seeds are indicated in bold text while text in italics indicates the round in which those seeds were eliminated. The top four seeded teams received byes into the second round.

Draw

Finals

Top half

Bottom half

External links
 1993 DFS Classic Draws

Birmingham Classic (tennis)
1993 WTA Tour